Hetty or Hettie is a female first name, often a diminutive form (hypocorism) of Henrietta. 

Hetty may refer to:

People 
Hetty Balkenende (born 1939), Dutch former freestyle and synchronized swimmer
Hettie Vyrine Barnhill, (born 1984), American dancer and choreographer
Henrietta Hetty Baynes (born 1956), English actress
Hetty Burlingame Beatty (1907–1971), American sculptor, children's author, and illustrator
Hetty Cary (1836–1892), a noted beauty of the Confederacy and one of the makers of the Confederate battle flag
Henrietta Hetty Green (1834–1916), American businesswoman and notorious miser
Hetty Goldman (1881–1972), American archaeologist, the first woman faculty member at the Institute for Advanced Study
Hetty Johnston (born 1958), Australian child protection activist and founder of the Bravehearts children's charity
Hettie Jones (born 1934), American poet and writer
Hetty King (1883–1972), stage name of English music hall entertainer Winifred Emms
 (born 1942), illustrator
Hettie MacDonald, British film, theatre and television director
Hetty Perkins (1900–1979), elder of the Arrernte people of Central Australia
Henrietta Hetty Tayler (1869–1951), British historical writer
Hetty Verolme (born 1930), Belgian-born Australian writer and Holocaust survivor

Fictional characters 
Henrietta "Hettie" Hubble, the heroine of The New Worst Witch, a sequel television series of The Worst Witch
Henrietta "Hetty" King, a major character in the television show Road to Avonlea
Henrietta "Hetty" Lange, from the American television show NCIS: Los Angeles
Hetty Sorrel, a major character in George Eliot's novel Adam Bede
Hetty Wainthropp, heroine of the British television series Hetty Wainthropp Investigates
Hettie, a nanny in the 1975 comedy film One of Our Dinosaurs Is Missing
Hetty Woodstone, one of the ghosts on the CBS television sitcom Ghosts.

Other 
 Hetty (vacuum), a vacuum in the Henry family of vacuums by Numatic

See also
Harriet (name)

Feminine given names
Hypocorisms